Bhagi Raj Ingnam is a Nepalese historian and retired government official. He is a researcher on Limbuwan history and traditions.

Biography 
He was born and brought up in Aathrai village, Terathum in a Subba (village chief) family. He studied Public Administration and passed the Loksewa examination to work as a civil servant for Nepal government. He served for Nepal government for 36 years  and retired as the chief district officer of Dhankuta in 2014. While preparing for civil service examinations, he found out that, the history in those exam and mainstream Nepali history differed to that of the actual history. So, he started researching about the Limbuwan history.

He spent seven years and NRs. 1.3 million to write his Madan Puraskar winning book, Limbuwanko Etihasik Dastavej Sangraha.

Awards 
In 2021, he won the Madan Puraskar, Nepal's highest literary honour, for his book Limbuwanko Etihasik Dastavej Sangraha. The book was selected out of 222 submission.

Works

See also 

 Satya Mohan Joshi
 Baburam Acharya
 Kesar Lall

References 

20th-century Nepalese historians
21st-century Nepalese male writers
Madan Puraskar winners
1956 births
Living people
People from Tehrathum District
Limbu people
Nepalese civil servants
Nepali-language writers from Nepal
21st-century Nepalese historians